HMS F3 was a British F class submarine of the Royal Navy. She was built at John I. Thornycroft & Company, laid down 12 October 1914 and launched 9 February 1916.

F3 was broken up in Portsmouth in 1920.

References 
 

 

British F-class submarines
1916 ships
Royal Navy ship names
Ships built in Southampton
Ships built by John I. Thornycroft & Company